The SNCF Class BB 63500 are a class of centre cab diesel locomotives built for SNCF between 1956 and 1971 by Brissonneau & Lotz. They are a slightly more powerful version of the BB 63400. A total of 580 locomotives were built. Three batches, numbered BB 63721–BB 63750, BB 63811–BB 63855 and BB 63981–BB 64020, totalling 115 locomotives, were equipped for multiple working.

Current Use
Between 1998 and 1992, a number of locomotives were rebuilt into "master and slave" units. The 25 pairs are designated as class 464800, and are operated by SNCF Logistics.

Though large numbers have been withdrawn in recent years, the survivors are operated by SNCF Infra, 27 locomotives with the prefix 6 added to their numbers, 16 by SNCF Intercités, with the prefix 1 added to their numbers, 3 by SNCF TER, with the prefix 5 added to their numbers, and 3 by SNCF CMR. The last three, BB 63624, BB 64061 and BB 64066, are dedicated to the movement of withdrawn vehicles.

Preservation
BB 63924 and BB 63816 were acquired by the Tourist Railway of Haut-Quercy.

BB 63852 is on the Aa Valley Tourist Railway (CFTVA).

040 DE 895 (ex BB 63895) is preserved at the Train à Vapeur en Limousin.

References

63500
B-B locomotives
BB 63500
Standard gauge locomotives of France